Saqr Ajail Al-Janabi (born July 10, 1993 in Wasit, Iraq) is an Iraqi footballer who plays as a goalkeeper for Al-Hedood in the Iraqi Premier League.

International career
In 2009, Saqr started playing for the Iraq U16, and then played for the 2012 AFC U-19 Championship with Iraq U19 and won the runner-up title in this championship.

He was called by coach Hakeem Shaker to play in the 2013 AFC U-22 Championship in Oman and he won the championship title with the team.

On September 15, 2015 Saqr was called by coach Yahya Alwan to play in the 2018 FIFA World Cup qualification.

Honours

International
Iraq Youth team
 2012 AFC U-19 Championship: runner-up
Iraq U-23
 AFC U-22 Championship: 2013

References

External links 
 on Goalzz.com
 on espnfc.com

1993 births
Living people
People from Wasit Governorate
Al-Mina'a SC players
Iraqi footballers
Iraq international footballers
Association football goalkeepers